John Chester Backus Pendleton (September 26, 1871 – February 12, 1938) was an American football coach and stockbroker from Baltimore, Maryland. He was the head coach of the Rutgers Scarlet Knights football team from 1896 to 1897.  He later became a member of the Baltimore Stock Exchange in 1897 and was employed thereafter as a stockbroker in that city.

Early years and Rutgers

A native of Baltimore, Maryland, Pendleton attended Princeton University.

Pendleton served as the head coach of the Rutgers Scarlet Knights football team from 1896 to 1897.  In two years as the head coach, he compiled a record of 8–13.

Business and military career
At the time of the 1900 United States Census, Pendleton was living in Baltimore and working as a stockbroker.

In the Quindecennial Record of Princeton's Class of 1892, issued in 1907, Pendleton was described as being "the stockbroking member of the '92 syndicate that runs Baltimore."  Pendleton wrote: "[T]he long, thing John, whom you once knew, is no more, as I now way two hundred and seventeen pounds in my birthday clothes.  In the year 1897 I became a member of the Baltimore Stock Exchange, in which business I am still engaged, being associated with the office of H. A. Harrick.  In January of this year I was lifted from the depths of single misery by being married, at which event Alf. Riggs ably assisted as my best man."

At the time of the 1910 United States Census, he was living with his wife and mother-in-law in Baltimore and was employed as a stockbroker.  He retired from stockbrokering in 1914. He served in the United States Army as a first lieutenant in the Procurement Division at Washington, D.C. during World War I from August 20, 1918, to January 13, 1919.  At the time of the 1920 and 1930 United States Censuses, Pendleton was living in Baltimore with his wife Mildred and listed no employment in the census records.

Personal life
In December 1906, The Washington Post announced as "one of the most important engagements of the year," that Pendleton, described as "a Princeton graduate and well-known clubman," had become engaged to Mildred Morris, described as "one of the best known and most accomplished girls in Baltimore."  The couple was married in Baltimore in January 1907.

Pendleton died in 1938 after a long illness.

Head coaching record

References

External links
 

1871 births
1938 deaths
American stockbrokers
Rutgers Scarlet Knights football coaches
Princeton University alumni
United States Army personnel of World War I
United States Army officers
Sportspeople from Baltimore